Milivoj Dukić (Миливој Дукић, born 26 March 1993) is Montenegrin sailor. He competed at the 2012, 2016 and 2021 Summer Olympics in the men's Laser class.

References

External links
 
 
 

1993 births
Living people
Montenegrin male sailors (sport)
Olympic sailors of Montenegro
Sailors at the 2012 Summer Olympics – Laser
Sailors at the 2016 Summer Olympics – Laser
Sailors at the 2020 Summer Olympics – Laser